Little Eve is the debut studio album by Australian singer-songwriter Kate Miller-Heidke. It was released on 26 May 2007 through Sony BMG, and was reissued twice, first with a bonus CD, and then with a bonus DVD. It reached number eleven on the ARIA Charts and received a gold certification.

Track listing
All songs produced by Magoo.

Double CD edition

CD/DVD edition

Charts

Certifications

Release history

References

2007 debut albums
Kate Miller-Heidke albums
Sony Music Australia albums